High Moorsley is a small village  south-west of Hetton-le-Hole in the City of Sunderland, north east England.

It is the site of the first weather radar system in the north-east of England, officially opened in July 2009.

High Moorsley Quarry is a Site of Special Scientific Interest for its Permian magnesian limestone formation.

References

Villages in Tyne and Wear
Sites of Special Scientific Interest in Tyne and Wear
City of Sunderland